The Collège des Quatre-Nations ("College of the Four Nations"), also known as the Collège Mazarin after its founder, was one of the colleges of the historic University of Paris. It was founded through a bequest by the Cardinal Mazarin.  At his death in 1661, he also bequeathed his library, the Bibliothèque Mazarine, which he had opened to scholars since 1643, to the Collège des Quatre-Nations.

Name and composition of the college
The name of the college alludes to the four nations of students at the medieval Parisian university. It was not intended for students of the historical university nations, but for those coming from territories which had recently come under French rule through the Peace of Westphalia (1648) and the Treaty of the Pyrenees (1659).

According to the Cardinal's will it was to have the following composition:

 Flanders, Artois, Hainaut, and Luxembourg (20 students);
 Alsace and other Germanic territories (15);
 Pignerol and the Papal states (15);
 Roussillon, Conflent, and Cerdagne (10).

Design and construction
Jean-Baptiste Colbert, who was one of five executors of Mazarin's estate, contrived to get the college built, appointing Louis Le Vau as the architect. Le Vau, who at the time was also working on the south wing of the Cour Carrée of the Palais du Louvre (facing the River Seine), proposed that the college be placed directly across the river on the Left Bank, so that the sovereign (Louis XIV) would have a fine view of it from his future apartments. The site was available because of the planned demolition of the Tour de Nesle and adjacent moat and wall of Philippe Auguste. Le Vau's quickly drawn plans were pronounced "fort beau" ("quite beautiful") by the king, and construction began in 1662 and continued up to Le Vau's death in 1670, when it was taken over by his draftsman, François d'Orbay. The college opened in 1688. In accordance with Mazarin's will, his tomb is in the college chapel.

Notable students
Notable students of the college include the encyclopedist Jean le Rond d'Alembert (1717–1783), the actor Henri Louis Cain (1728–1778), the painter Jacques-Louis David (1748–1825), the critic Julien Louis Geoffroy (1743–1814), the chemist Antoine-Laurent Lavoisier (1743–1794), and the mathematician Adrien-Marie Legendre (1752–1833).

Later history
After the colleges were suppressed during the French revolution, the complex was used for various purposes until, in 1805, it was given to the Institut de France. It has since become known as the Palais de l'Institut de France.

Notes

Bibliography
 Ayers, Andrew (2004). The Architecture of Paris. Stuttgart; London: Edition Axel Menges. .
 Babelon, Jean-Pierre (2001).  originally at the website of the Institut de France (PDF)
 Ballon, Hilary (1999). Louis Le Vau: Mazarin's Collège, Colbert's Revenge. Princeton: Princeton University Press. .

External links

Quatre-Nations
Schools in Paris
1662 establishments in France
Educational institutions established in the 1680s
Cardinal Mazarin